HMS Lightning was a torpedo boat, built by John Thornycroft at Church Wharf in Chiswick for the Royal Navy, which entered service in 1876 and was the first seagoing vessel to be armed with self-propelled Whitehead torpedoes. She was later renamed Torpedo Boat No. 1.

As originally built, Lightning had two drop collars to launch torpedoes; these were replaced in 1879 by a single torpedo tube in the bow. She also carried two reload torpedoes amidships.

The Lightning spent her life as a tender to the torpedo school HMS Vernon at Portsmouth and was used for some experiments. She was broken up in 1896.

Sources 

Chesneau, Roger and Eugène Kolesnik, Conway's All the World's Fighting Ships 1860–1905. London: Conway Maritime Press, 1979, 

Torpedo boats of the Royal Navy
Ships built in Chiswick
1876 ships
Ships built by John I. Thornycroft & Company